The 1935 Football Championship of UkrSSR were part of the 1935 Soviet republican football competitions in the Soviet Ukraine.

Persha Hrupa

Druha Hrupa
1/4 finals
 Chernihiv — Horlivka + : - (no show)
 Kramatorsk — Kadiivka 1 : 0
 Tiraspol — Mykolaiv 1 : 3
 Kostyantynivka — Vinnytsia 8 : 1
 
1/2 finals
 Chernihiv — Kramatorsk 0 : 7
 Mykolaiv — Kostyantynivka + : - (score 4:5 was annulled, as the ejected with two minutes to play, player of visitors Kononenko refused to leave a field)
 
Final.
 Kramatorsk — Mykolaiv 1 : 1
 Kramatorsk — Mykolaiv 2 : 0 (replay)

Tretia Hrupa
1/4 finals
Zaporizhia — Kherson 4:0
Poltava — Kryvyi Rih 2:7
Luhansk — Kamianske 3:1
Kamianets-Podilsk — Zhytomyr —:+

1/2 finals 
Zaporizhia — Kryvyi Rih 5:3
Luhansk — Zhytomyr 5:0

Final
Luhansk — Zaporizhia 2:1 (score of the game was annulled as in Luhansk's squad played goalkeeper Pavlov who during the ongoing year played for Kadiivka).
Zaporizhia — Luhansk 1:3 (replay)

References

External links
 1921-1935 (1921-1935 года). History of Soviet championships among KFK.
 Football championship of the UkrSSR 1921–1936 (spring) (Чемпіонати УРСР 1921-1936(весна)). Kopanyi myach.

Football Championship of the Ukrainian SSR
Championship
Ukr